Sherman Hall may refer to:
Sherman Hall (Western Illinois University), the main administrative building of Western Illinois University
Sherman Hall (fencer) (1885–1954), American fencer